Artur Albeiro García Rincón (born 26 January 1984 in San Juan de Colón, Táchira) is a Venezuelan racing cyclist.

Major results

2004
 10th Overall Vuelta a Venezuela
1st Stages 10 & 12
2005
 1st Clásica de la Consolación
 1st Stage 5 Vuelta a Cuba
 2nd Overall Vuelta a Venezuela
2006
 1st Stage 6 Vuelta Ciclista de Chile
 1st Stage 5 Vuelta Internacional al Estado Trujillo
 1st Stage 4 Vuelta al Oriente
 3rd  Road race, Central American and Caribbean Games
 3rd  Road race, South American Games
2007
 1st Stage 2 Clásico Ciclístico Banfoandes
2008
 Vuelta a Colombia
1st  Sprints classification
1st Stages 1 & 14
 1st Stage 1 Vuelta al Táchira
 1st Stage 1 Vuelta a Venezuela
 1st Stage 9 Clásico Ciclístico Banfoandes
2009
 Vuelta al Táchira
1st Stages 2 & 5
 1st Stage 6 Vuelta a Colombia
 3rd Road race, National Road Championships
2010
 1st Stage 3 Vuelta a Venezuela
 1st Stage 1 Vuelta a Guatemala
2011
 1st Stage 6 Vuelta al Táchira
2012
 2nd Overall Vuelta a Venezuela
1st Stage 2
2013
 Vuelta a Bolivia
1st Stages 5 & 10b
2015
 1st Stage 1 Vuelta al Táchira
2017
 6th Overall Vuelta a Venezuela
1st Stage 7
2018
 1st Stage 7 Vuelta del Uruguay
 2nd Road race, National Road Championships

External links

1984 births
Living people
Cyclists at the 2011 Pan American Games
Venezuelan male cyclists
Vuelta a Colombia stage winners
Vuelta Ciclista de Chile stage winners
Vuelta a Venezuela stage winners
People from Táchira
Central American and Caribbean Games bronze medalists for Venezuela
South American Games bronze medalists for Venezuela
South American Games medalists in cycling
Competitors at the 2006 South American Games
Competitors at the 2006 Central American and Caribbean Games
Central American and Caribbean Games medalists in cycling
Pan American Games competitors for Venezuela